Paul Nicolai Hartmann (20 February 1882 – 9 October 1950) was a Baltic German philosopher. He is regarded as a key representative of critical realism and as one of the most important twentieth-century metaphysicians.

Biography
Hartmann was born a Baltic German in Riga, which was then the capital of the Governorate of Livonia in the Russian Empire, and which is now in Latvia. He was the son of the engineer Carl August Hartmann and his wife Helene, born Hackmann. He attended from 1897 the German-language high school in Saint Petersburg. In the years 1902–1903 he studied Medicine at the University of Yuryev (now Tartu), and 1903–1905 classical philology and philosophy at the Saint Petersburg Imperial University with his friend Vasily Sesemann. In 1905 he went to the University of Marburg, where he studied with the neo-Kantians Hermann Cohen and Paul Natorp. In Marburg began a lifelong friendship with Heinz Heimsoeth. In 1907 he received his doctorate with the thesis Das Seinsproblem in der griechischen Philosophie vor Plato (The Problem of Being in Greek Philosophy Before Plato). In 1909 he published the book Platos Logik des Seins (The Logic of Being in Plato). The same year he completed his habilitation on Proclus: Des Proklus Diadochus philosophische Anfangsgründe der Mathematik (Proclus Diadochus' Philosophical Elements of Mathematics).

In 1911, Hartmann married Alice Stepanitz, with whom he had a daughter, Dagmar, in 1912. In 1912 he published Die philosophischen Grundfragen der Biologie (The Philosophical Foundations of Biology). From 1914 to 1918 he did military service as an interpreter, letter censor, and intelligence officer. In 1919, i.e., after the war, he received a position as Privatdozent in Marburg. Around this time he met Martin Heidegger. In 1920 he became Associate Professor (außerordentlicher Professor) and in 1921 appeared the work that established him as an independent philosophical thinker, Grundzüge einer Metaphysik der Erkenntnis (Foundation of a Metaphysics of Knowledge). The following year he became Full Professor (ordentlicher Professor) as successor of the Chair held by Natorp. In 1925, he moved to Cologne, where he came into contact with Max Scheler. In 1926 he published his second major work—Ethik—in which he develops a material value ethics akin to that of Scheler. The same year he divorced from his wife.

In 1929 Hartmann married Frida Rosenfeld, with whom he had a son, Olaf (1930), and a daughter, Lise (1932). In 1931 he became Professor of Theoretical Philosophy in Berlin. He held the Chair until 1945. During this time he successively published many pieces of his ontology: Das Problem des geistigen Seins (The Problem of Spiritual Being) (1933), Zur Grundlegung der Ontologie (On the Foundation of Ontology) (1935), Möglichkeit und Wirklichkeit (Possibility and Actuality) (1938) and Der Aufbau der realen Welt. Grundriß der allgemeinen Kategorienlehre (The Structure of the Real World. Outline of the General Theory of Categories) (1940). The unrest of the National Socialist period seems to have left Hartmann relatively undisturbed in his task of developing a new ontology. In the "'-Dossiers über Philosophie-Professoren" (i.e. SD-files concerning philosophy professors) that were set up by the SS Security Service (SD) Nicolai Hartmann was classified from an SS-point of view in the following way: "has always been a nationalist. Loyal to National Socialism, too, without political activity, but a social attitude has to be acknowledged. (cf. donations to the NSV and hosting children during school vacations)".

In 1942, Hartmann edited a volume entitled Systematische Philosophie, in which he contributed the essay Neue Wege der Ontologie (New Ways of Ontology), which summarizes his work in ontology.

Between 1945 and 1950, Hartmann taught in Göttingen. He died of a stroke in 1950. In the year of his death, there appeared his Philosophie der Natur (Philosophy of Nature). His works Teleologisches Denken (Teleological Thinking) (1951) and Ästhetik (Aesthetics) (1953) were published posthumously.

He is regarded as an important representative of critical realism and as one of the major metaphysicians of the twentieth century. Among Hartmann's many students were Boris Pasternak, Hans-Georg Gadamer, Emil Cioran, Jakob Klein, Delfim Santos and Max Wehrli. He is the modern discoverer of emergence — originally called by him categorial novum. His encyclopedic work is basically forgotten today, although famous during his lifetime. His early work in the philosophy of biology has been cited in modern discussions of genomics and cloning, and his views on consciousness and free will are currently in vogue among contributors to the Journal of Consciousness Studies.

Ontology 
Nicolai Hartmann equates ontology with Aristotle's science of being qua being. This science involves studying the most general characteristics of entities, usually referred to as categories, and the relations between them. According to Hartmann, the most general categories are:
 Moments of being (Seinsmomente): existence (Dasein) and essence (Sosein)
 Modes of being (Seinsweisen): reality and ideality
 Modalities of being (Seinsmodi): possibility, actuality and necessity

Existence and essence 
The existence of an entity constitutes the fact that this entity is there, that it exists. Essence, on the other hand, constitutes what this entity is like, what its characteristics are. Every entity has both of these modes of being. But, as Hartmann points out, there is no absolute difference between existence and essence. For example, the existence of a leaf belongs to the essence of the tree while the existence of the tree belongs to the essence of the forest.

Reality and ideality 
Reality and ideality are two disjunctive categories: every entity is either real or ideal. Ideal entities are universal, returnable and always existing while real entities are individual, unique and destructible. Among the ideal entities are mathematical objects and values. Reality is made up of a chain of temporal events. Reality is obtrusive, it is often experienced as a form of resistance in contrast to ideality.

Modalities of being 
The modalities of being are divided into the absolute modalities (actuality and non-actuality) and the relative modalities (possibility, impossibility and necessity). The relative modalities are relative in the sense that they depend on the absolute modalities: something is possible, impossible or necessary because something else is actual. Hartmann analyzes modality in the real sphere in terms of necessary conditions. An entity becomes actual if all its necessary conditions obtain. If all these factors obtain, it is necessary that the entity exists. But as long as one of its factors is missing, it can't become actual, it is impossible. This has the consequence that all positive and all the negative modalities fall together: whatever is possible is both actual and necessary, whatever is not necessary is both non-actual and impossible. This is true also in the ideal sphere, where possibility is given by being free from contradictions.

Levels of reality 
In Hartmann's ontological theory, the levels of reality are: (1) the inorganic level (German: anorganische Schicht), (2) the organic level (organische Schicht), (3) the psychical/emotional level (seelische Schicht) and (4) the intellectual/cultural level (geistige Schicht). In The Structure of the Real World (Der Aufbau der realen Welt), Hartmann postulates four laws that apply to the levels of reality.

 The law of recurrence: Lower categories recur in the higher levels as a subaspect of higher categories, but never vice versa.
 The law of modification: The categorial elements modify in their recurrence in the higher levels (they are shaped by the characteristics of the higher levels).
 The law of the novum: The higher category is composed of a diversity of lower elements, but it is a specific novum that is not included in the lower levels.
 The law of distance between levels: Since the different levels do not develop continuously but in leaps, they can be clearly distinguished.

Ethical theory

The central concept of Hartmann's ethical theory is that of a value.  Hartmann's 1926 book, Ethik, elaborates a material ethics of value according to which moral knowledge is achieved through phenomenological investigation into our experiences of values.  Moral phenomena are understood by Hartmann to be experiences of a realm of being which is distinct from that of material things, namely, the realm of values.  The values inhabiting this realm are unchanging, super-temporal, and super-historical, though human consciousness of them shifts in focus over time.  Borrowing a style of phrase from Kant, Hartmann characterizes values as conditions of the possibility of goods; in other words, values are what make it possible for situations in the world to be good.  Our knowledge of the goodness (or badness) of situations is derived from our emotional experiences of them, experiences which are made possible by an a priori capacity for the appreciation of value.  For Hartmann, this means that our awareness of the value of a state of affairs is not arrived at through a process of reasoning, but rather, by way of an experience of feeling, which he calls valuational consciousness.  If, then, ethics is the study of what one ought to do, or what states of affairs one ought to bring about, such studies, according to Hartmann, must be carried out by paying close attention to our emotional capacities to discern what is valuable in the world.  As such, Hartmann's conception of proper moral philosophy contrasts with rationalist and formalist theories, such as Kant's, according to which ethical knowledge is derived from purely rational principles.

Quotations

"The tragedy of man is that of somebody who is starving and sitting at a richly laden table but does not reach out with his hand, because he cannot see what is right in front of him. For the real world has inexhaustible splendour, the real life is full of meaning and abundance, where we grasp it, it is full of miracles and glory."

Works

Works in German
Books
 1909, Des Proklus Diadochus philosophische Anfangsgründe der Mathematik, Töpelmann, Gießen.
 1909, Platos Logik des Seins, Töpelmann, Gießen. 
 1912, Philosophische Grundfragen der Biologie, Vandenhoeck & Ruprecht, Göttingen.
 1921, Grundzüge einer Metaphysik der Erkenntnis, Vereinigung wissenschaftlichen. Verleger, Berlin.
 1923, Die Philosophie des deutschen Idealismus 1: Fichte, Schelling und die Romantik, de Gruyter, Berlin.
 1926, Ethik, de Gruyter, Berlin-Leipzig.
 1929, Die Philosophie des deutschen Idealismus 2: Hegel, de Gruyter, Berlin.
 1931, Zum Problem der Realitätsgegebenheit, Pan-Verlagsgesellschaft, Berlin.
 1933, Das Problem des geistigen Seins. Untersuchungen zur Grundlegung der Geschichtsphilosophie und der Geisteswissenschaften, de Gruyter, Berlin-Leipzig.
 1935, Ontologie, (4 Volumes) I: Zur Grundlegung der Ontologie, de Gruyter, Berlin-Leipzig.
 1938, II: Möglichkeit und Wirklichkeit, de Gruyter, Berlin.
 1940, III: Der Aufbau der realen Welt: Grundriß d. allg. Kategorienlehre , de Gruyter, Berlin.
 1942, Systematische Philosophie, Kohlhammer Verlag, Stuttgart & Berlin.
 1943, Neue Wege der Ontologie, Kohlhammer Verlag, Stuttgart.
 1949, Einführung in die Philosophie, Luise Hanckel Verlag, Hannover.
 1950, IV: Philosophie der Natur : Abriss der speziellen Kategorienlehre, de Gruyter, Berlin.
 1951, Teleologisches Denken, de Gruyter, Berlin.
 1953, Asthetik, de Gruyter, Berlin.
 1954, Philosophische Gespräche, Vandenhoeck & Ruprecht, Göttingen.
 1955, Der philosophische Gedanke und seine Geschichte, Zeitlichkeit und Substantialität, Sinngebung und Sinnerfüllung, de Gruyter, Berlin.
 1955, Kleinere Schriften ; *Bd. 1* Abhandlungen zur systematischen Philosophie, de Gruyter, Berlin.
 1957, Kleinere Schriften ; *Bd. 2* Abhandlungen zur Philosophie-Geschichte, de Gruyter, Berlin.
 1958, Kleinere Schriften ; *Bd. 3* Vom Neukantianismus zur Ontologie, de Gruyter, Berlin.

Articles
 1924, Diesseits von Idealismus und Realismus : Ein Beitrag zur Scheidg d. Geschichtl. u. Übergeschichtl. in d. Kantischen Philosophie  in: Sonderdrucke der Kantischen Studien, Pan Verlag R. Heise Berlin, pp. 160–206.
 1926, Aristoteles und Hegel, Beitrage zur Philosophie des Deutschen Idealismus, 3 (1923), pp. 1–36.
 1927, "Über die Stellung der ästhetischen Werte im Reich der Werte überhaupt", in Proceedings of the Sixth International Congress of Philosophy, Edgar Sheffield Brightman (ed.), New York: Longmans, Green, and Co, pp. 428–436.
 1933, Systematische Selbstdarstellung in: Deutsche systematische Philosophie nach ihren Gestaltern, Ebda, Berlin : Junker & Dünnhaupt, pp. 283–340.
 1935, Das Problem des Apriorismus in der Platonischen Philosophie in: Sitzungsberichte d. Preuss. Akad. d. Wiss. Phil.-hist. Kl. 1935, 15, de Gruyter, Berlin.
 1936, Der philosophische Gedanke und seine Geschichte, in: Abhandlungen d. Preuss. Akad. d. Wissenschaften. Phil.-hist. Kl. 1936, Nr 5, de Gruyter, Berlin.
 1937, Der megarische und der Aristotelische Möglichkeitsbegriff : Ein Beitr. zur Geschichte d. ontolog. Modalitätsproblems, in; Sitzungsberichte d. Preuss. Akad. d. Wiss. Phil.-hist. Kl. 1937, 10, de Gruyter, Berlin.
 1938, Heinrich Maiers Beitrag zum Problem der Kategorien, in:  Sitzungsberichte d. Preuss. Akad. d. Wiss. Phil.-hist. Kl. 1938, de Gruyter, Berlin.
 1939, Aristoteles und das Problem des Begriffs, in: Abhandlungen der Preussischen Akademie der Wissenschaften : Philosophisch-historische Klasse ; Jg. 1939, Nr 5, de Gruyter, Berlin.
 1941, “Zur Lehre vom Eidos bei Platon und Aristoteles”, in: Abhandlungen d. Preuss. Akad. d. Wiss. Phil.-hist. Kl. Jg. 1941, Nr 8, de Gruyter, Berlin.
 1942, Neue Wege der Ontologie, in: Systematische Philosophie, N. Hartmann, editor, Stuttgart.
 1943, Die Anfänge des Schichtungsgedankens in der alten Philosophie, in:  Abhandlungen der Preußischen Akademie der Wissenschaften : Philosophisch-historische Klasse ; Jg. 1943, Nr 3, de Gruyter, Berlin.
 1946, Leibniz als Metaphysiker, de Gruyter, Berlin.

Translations in English
 Nicolai Hartmann, Ethics, London: George Allen & Unwin 1932. Reprinted with a new introduction by Andreas A. M. Kinneging - New Brunswick, Transaction Publishers, 2002-2004 in three volumes: I. Moral phenomena (2002); II. Moral values (2004); III. Moral freedom (2004).
 Nicolai Hartmann, "German Philosophy in the Last Ten Years", translated by John Ladd, Mind: A Quarterly Review of Psychology and Philosophy, vol. 58, no. 232, 1949, pp. 413–433.
 Nicolai Hartmann, New Ways of Ontology, Westport: Greenwood Press, 1952 (Reprinted with a new introduction by P. Cicovacki, Transaction Publishers, 2012).
 Nicolai Hartmann, "How Is Critical Ontology Possible? Toward the Foundation of the General Theory of the Categories, Part One", translated from "Wie ist kritische Ontologie überhaupt möglich?" (1924) by Keith R. Peterson, Axiomathes, vol. 22, 2012, pp. 315-354.
 Nicolai Hartmann, Possibility and Actuality. Berlin: Walter de Gruyter, 2013 (Translation by Alex Scott and Stephanie Adair of Möglichkeit und Wirklichkeit, 1938).
 Nicolai Hartmann, Aesthetics. Berlin: Walter de Gruyter, 2014 (Translation by Eugene Kelly of Ästhetik, 1953).
 Nicolai Hartmann, " The Megarian and the Aristotelian Concept of Possibility: A Contribution to the History of the Ontological Problem of Modality". Axiomathes, 2017 (Translation by Frederic Tremblay and Keith R. Peterson of "Der Megarische und der Aristotelische Möglichkeitsbegriff: ein Beitrag zur Geschichte des ontologischen Modalitätsproblems", 1937).
 Nicolai Hartmann, "Max Scheler", translated by Frederic Tremblay, in Nicolai Hartmanns Neue Ontologie und die Philosophische Anthropologie: Menschliches Leben in Natur und Geist, edited by Moritz Kalckreuth, Gregor Schmieg, Friedrich Hausen, Berlin: Walter de Gruyter, 2019, pp. 263-272.
 Nicolai Hartmann, Ontology: Laying the Foundations, Translation and Introduction by Keith R. Peterson, Berlin: De Gruyter, 2019.

See also
Supervenience

References

Further reading
Books
 1952, H. Heimsoeth and others, N. Hartmann, der Denker und seine Werk.
 1957, Jitendra Nath Mohanty, Nicolai Hartmann and Alfred North Whitehead: A Study in Recent Platonism, Calcutta: Progressive Publishers.
 1959, H. Hulsmann, Die Methode in der Philosophie N. Hartmanns.
 1962, K. Kanthack, N. Hartmann und das Ende der Ontologie.
 1965, I. Wirth, Realismus und Apriorismus in N. Hartmanns Erkenntnistheorie.
 1965, J. B. Forsche, Zur Philosophie Nicolai Hartmann".
 1971, E. Hammer-Kraft, Freiheit und Dependenz im Schichtdenken Nicolai Hartmanns.
 1973, R. Gamp, Die interkategoriale Relation und die dialektische Methode in der Philosophie N. Hartmanns.
 1974, S. U. Kang, Nächstenliebe und Fernstenliebe Eine kritische Auseinandersetzung mit Nicolai Hartmann.
 1974, Imre Szilágyi, Az érték szférája és objektivitásának paradoxonja (N. Hartmann értéketikájának kritikájához), Budapest.
 1982, Herbert Spiegelberg, The Phenomenological Movement: A Historical Introduction, The Hague: Martinus Nijhoff. (Chapter VI: Phenomenology in the Critical Ontology of Nicolai Hartmann).
 1984, Eva Hauel Cadwallader, Searchlight on Values: Nicolai Hartmann's Twentieth-Century Value Platonism, Washington: University press of America.
 1987, Dong-Hyun Son, Die Seinsweise des objektivierten Geistes: Eine Untersuchung im Anschluss an Nicolai Hartmanns Problematik des "geistigen Seins", Peter Lang
 1989, Arnd. Grötz, Nicolai Hartmanns Lehre vom Menschen, Frankfurt am Main, Lang.
 1990, William H. Werkmeister, Nicolai Hartmann's New Ontology, Tallahassee, Florida State University Press.
 1992, Roland H. Feucht, Die Neoontologie Nicolai Hartmanns im Licht der evolutionären Erkenntnistheorie, Regensburg, Roderer.
 1994, Abolghassem Sakersadeh, Immanenz und Transzendenz als ungelöste Problematik in der Philosophie Nicolai Hartmanns, Münster, Lit.
 1996, João Maurício Adeodato, Filosofia do direito: uma crítica à verdade na ética e na ciência (através de um exame da ontologia de Nicolai Hartmann), São Paulo, Saraiva.
 1997, Martin Morgenstern,Nicolai Hartmann zur Einführung, Hamburg, Junius.
 2000, Wolfgang, Harich, Nicolai Hartmann - Größe und Grenzen, edited by Martin Morgenstern, Wurzburg: Königshausen und Neumann.
 2001, Axiomathes (Springer), 12:3-4, special issue on N. Hartmann (Includes papers by Albertazzi, Cicovacki, Da Re, Johansson, Peruzzi, Poli, Tegtmeier, van der Schaar, Wildgen)
 2001, Nebil Reyhani, Hermann Weins Auseinandersetzung mit Nicolai Hartmann als sein Weg von der Ontologie zu einer philosophischen Kosmologie, PhD dissertation, Johannes Gutenberg-Universität, Mainz.
 2003, Gerhard Ehrl, Nicolai Hartmanns philosophische Anthropologie in systematischer Perspektive, Cuxhave, Junghans.
 2004, Alessandro Gamba, In principio era il fine. Ontologia e teleologia in Nicolai Hartmann, Milano, Vita e Pensiero.
 2007, Leszek Kopciuch, "Człowiek i historia u Nicolaia Hartmanna", Lublin, Wydawnictwo Uniwersytetu Marii Curie-Skłodowskiej.
 2009 Giuseppe D'Anna "Nicolai Hartmann. Dal conoscere all'essere", Brescia, Morcelliana
 2010, Leszek Kopciuch, "Wolnośc a wartości. Max Scheler - Nicolai Hartmann - Dietrich von Hildebrand - Hans Reiner", Lublin, Wydawnictwo Uniwersytetu Marii Curie-Skłodowskiej.
 2011, Roberto Poli, Carlo Scognamiglio and Frederic Tremblay (eds.), The Philosophy of Nicolai Hartmann, Berlin, Walter de Gruyter.
 2011, Eugene Kelly, Material Ethics of Value: Max Scheler and Nicolai Hartmann, Dordrecht: Springer.
 2012, Alicja Pietras, "W stronę ontologii. Nicolaia Hartmanna i Martina Heideggera postneokantowskie projekty filozofii", Kraków, Uniwersitas.
 2016, Keith Peterson and Roberto Poli (eds.), New Research on the Philosophy of Nicolai Hartmann, Berlin, Walter de Gruyter.

Articles
 1935, Hilda Oakeley, "Professor Nicolai Hartmann's Concept of Objective Spirit," Mind, vol. 44, pp. 39–57.
 1942, Lewis White Beck, "Nicolai Hartmann's Criticism of Kant's Theory of Knowledge," Philosophy and Phenomenological Research, vol. 2, pp. 472–500.
 1943, Michael Landmann, "Nicolai Hartmann and Phenomenology," Philosophy and Phenomenological Research, vol. 3 pp. 393–423.
 1951, Helmut Kuhn, "Nicolai Hartmann's Ontology," Philosophical Quarterly, vol. 1, pp. 289–318.
 1953, Jacob Taubes, "The Development of the Ontological Question in Recent German Philosophy," Review of Metaphysics, vol. 6, pp. 651–664.
 1954, John E. Smith, "Hartmann's New Ontology," Review of Metaphysics, vol. 7, pp. 583–601.
 1956, Eva Schaper, "The Aesthetics of Hartmann and Bense," Review of Metaphysics, vol. 10, pp. 289–307.
 1960, Helen James, "Nicolai Hartmann's Study of Human Personality," New Scholasticism, vol. 34, pp. 204–233.
 1961, Robert Hein, "Nicolai Hartmann: A Personal Sketch," Personalist, vol 42, pp. 469–486.
 1963, Stanislas Breton, "Ontology and Ontologies: The Contemporary Situation," International Philosophical Quarterly, vol. 3, pp. 339–369.
 1963, Paul K. Feyerabend, "Professor Hartmann's Philosophy of Nature," Ratio, vol. 5, pp. 91–106.
 1963, Jitendra Nath Mohanty, "Remarks on Nicolai Hartmann's Modal Doctrine," Kant Studien, vol. 54, pp. 181–187.
 1966, Caroline Schuetzinger, "The Gnoseological Transcendence in Nicolai Hartmann's Metaphysics of Cognition (First Part)," Thomist, vol. 30, pp. 1–37.
 1966, Caroline Schuetzinger, "The Gnoseological Transcendence in Nicolai Hartmann's Metaphysics of Cognition (Second Part)," Thomist, vol. 30, pp. 136–196.
 1984, Richard Bodeus, "The Problem of Freedom According to Nicolai Hartmann," International Philosophical Quarterly, vol. 24, pp. 55–60.
 1984, Eva Hauel Cadwallader, "The Continuing Relevance of Nicolai Hartmann's Theory of Value", Journal of Value Inquiry, vol. 18, pp. 113–121.
 1984, Frederick Kraenzel, "Nicolai Hartmann's Doctrine of Ideal Values: An Examination," Journal of Value Inquiry, vol. 18, pp. 299–306.
 1986, Janina Makota, "Nicolai Hartmann's and Roman Ingarden's Philosophy of Man," Reports on Philosophy, vol. 10, pp. 69–79.
 1994, Wolfgang Drechsler and Rainer Kattel, "Nicolai Hartmann", Akademia, vol. 6, pp. 1579–1592.
 1997, Robert Welsh Jordan, "Nicolai Hartmann." Encyclopedia of Phenomenology, eds Lester Embree, Elizabeth A. Behnke, Thomas Seebohm, Jitendra Nath Mohanty, Joseph J. Kockelmans, et al. Contributions to Phenomenology, vol. 18, Dordrecht; Boston: Kluwer Academic Publishers; 288-292.
 1998, Roberto Poli, "Levels," Axiomathes: An International Journal in Ontology and Cognitive Systems, vol. 9, pp. 197–211.
 2001, Predrag Cicovacki, "New Ways of Ontology - The Ways of Interaction", Axiomathes: An International Journal in Ontology and Cognitive Systems, vol. 12, pp. 159–170.
 2001, Gabor Csepregi, "The Relevance of Nicolai Hartmann's Musical Aesthetics," Axiomathes: An International Journal in Ontology and Cognitive Systems, vol. 12, pp. 339–354.
 2001, Antonio Da Re, "Objective Spirit and Personal Spirit in Hartmann's Philosophy," Axiomathes, vol. 12, pp. 317–326.
 2001, Ingvar Johansson, "Hartmann's Nondeductive Materialism, Superimposition, and Supervenience," Axiomathes, vol. 12, pp. 195–215.
 2001, Leszek Kopciuch, "Metafizyka historii u Nicolaia Hartmanna. Granice rozumu historycznego", in:  Z. J. Czarnecji (ed.), "Dylematy racjonalności. Między rozumem teoretycznym a praktycznym, Lublin: Wydawnictwo Uniwersytetu Marii Curie-Sklodowoskiej, pp. 133-152.
 2001, Erwin Tegtmeier, "Hartmann's General Ontology," Axiomathes: An International Journal in Ontology and Cognitive Systems, vol. 12, pp. 217–225.
 2001, Maria Van der Schaar, "Hartmann's Rejection of the Notion of Evidence," Axiomathes: An International Journal in Ontology and Cognitive Systems, vol. 12, pp. 285–297.
 2001, Robert Welsh Jordan, "Hartmann, Schutz, and the Hermeneutics of Action," Axiomathes: An International Journal in Ontology and Cognitive Systems, vol. 12, pp. 327–338.
 2001, Roberto Poli, "The Basic Problem of the Theory of Levels of Reality," Axiomathes: An International Journal in Ontology and Cognitive Systems, vol. 12, pp. 261–283.
 2001, Alberto Peruzzi, "Hartmann's Stratified Reality," Axiomathes: An International Journal in Ontology and Cognitive Systems, vol. 12, pp. 227–260.
2002, Robert Welsh Jordan, "Nicolai Hartmann: Proper Ethics is Atheistic, Phenomenological Approaches to Moral Philosophy. a Handbook, edited by John J. Drummond and Lester Embree, Dordrecht; Boston; London: Kluwer Academic Publishers, 175-196. 
 2005, Leszek Kopciuch, "Aprioryzm w czuciu wartości u N. Hartmanna", in: H. Jakuszko (ed.), "Racjonalność teoretyczna i praktyczna", „Annales UMCS”, vol. XXX, Sect. I, pp. 153–173.
 2006, Leszek Kopciuch, "Krytyka relatywizmu aksjologicznego u N. Hartmanna", „Edukacja Filozoficzna” vol. 41, pp. 157–170.
 2006, Alicja Pietras, "Pojęcie kategorii a problem granic poznania. Nicolai Hartmann a Immanuel Kant", „Czasopismo Filozoficzne” vol 1, pp. 22-40.
 2007, Leszek Kopciuch, "O sile i bezsile wartości u Nicolaia Hartmanna", in: K. łojek (red.), "Człowiek w kulturze", Warszawa: Wydawnictwo  WSFiZ, pp. 233–244.
 2007, Leszek Kopciuch, "Przedmiot czucia wartości w etyce N. Hartmanna", „Etyka”, No.40, pp. 49–61.
 2007, Leszek Kopciuch, "O trudnościach w poznawaniu wartości etycznych u N. Hartmanna", in: M. Hetmański (ed.), "Epistemologia współcześnie", Kraków: Universitas, pp. 445–453.
 2008, Leszek Kopciuch, "O różnicy w budowie dzieła sztuki u R. Ingardena i N. Hartmanna (w sprawie zarzutów Ingardena względem N. Hartmanna)", „Kwartalnik Filozoficzny”, vol. XXXVI, issue 2, pp. 101–114.
 2008, Leszek Kopciuch, "Zum Problem der Geschichtsphilosophie bei N. Hartmann", in: D. Pater (ed.)"Eine Philosophie – eine Welt – ein Mensch", Hannover: Europäische Akademie der Naturwissenschaften, pp. 13–28.
 2008, Alicja Pietras, "Nicolaia Hartmanna krytyka logicyzmu". W: Z problemów współczesnej humanistyki III. Red. A. J. Noras. Katowice 2008, p. 95-111.
 2009, Leszek Kopciuch, "Wolna wola – G. W. Leibniz i N. Hartmann", in: H. Jakuszko, L. Kopciuch (ed.), "W kręgu zagadnień filozofii XVII wieku", Lublin: Lubelskie Towarzystwo Naukowe, Wydawnictwo Olech, pp. 213–222.
 2009, Leszek Kopciuch, "Nicolaia Hartmanna prawa bytu realnego", „Acta Universitatis Lodziensis”, Folia Philosophica, vol. 22, pp. 105–115
 2010, Leszek Kopciuch, "Kilka uwag o stosunku Hartmanna do etyki Kanta, „Studia Philosophica Wratislaviensia”, vol. V, fasc. 2, pp. 167–170.
 2010, Leszek Kopciuch, "O stosunku N. Hartmanna do A. Schopenhauera, „Idea. Studia nad strukturą i rozwojem pojęć filozoficznych”, vol. XXII, pp. 51–61.
 2011, Frederic Tremblay, "Nicolai Hartmann's Definition of Biological Species," in R. Poli, C. Scognamiglio, F. Tremblay (eds.), The Philosophy of Nicolai Hartmann, Berlin: Walter de Gruyter, pp. 125-139.
 2011, Leszek Kopciuch, "Nicolaia Hartmanna krytyka podmiotu transcendentalnego w etyce", in: P. Parszutowicz, M. Soin (ed.), "Idea transcendentalizmu. Od Kanta do Wittgensteina", Warszawa: Wydawnictwo IFiS PAN, pp. 279–294.
2011, Alicja Pietras, "Nicolai Hartmann as a Post-Neo-Kantian", in R. Poli, C. Scognamiglio, F. Tremblay (eds.), The Philosophy of Nicolai Hartmann, Berlin: Walter de Gruyter, pp. 237-251.
 2011, Alicja Pietras, "Recepcja myśli Kanta w filozofii Hartmanna i Heideggera. Problem relacji między filozofią a naukami szczegółowymi", in: A. J. Noras, T. Kubalica (eds.), "Filozofia Kanta i jej recepcja",  Katowice 2011,  Wydawnictwo Uniwersytetu Śląskiego, pp. 217-228.
 2012, Alicja Pietras, "O interpretacji z punktu widzenia ontologii bytu duchowego Nicolaia Hartmanna", in: M. Brodnicki, J. Jakubowska, K. Jaroń (eds.), "Historia interpretacji. Interpretacja historii", Gdańsk 2012, Wydawnictwo Uniwersytetu Gdańskiego, pp. 25-35.
 2012, Alicja Pietras, "Pojęcie aprioryczności w filozofii Nicolaia Hartmanna", "Ruch Filozoficzny",Tom LXIX, nr 3-4, Toruń 2012, pp. 421-435. 
 2013, Alicja Pietras, "Nicolaia Hartmanna projekt syntezy myślenia i intuicji", "Przegląd Filozoficzny – Nowa Seria", R 22: 2013, Nr 1 (85), pp. 335-350. 
 2013, Alicja Pietras, "Problem principium individuationis w ontologii Nicolaia Hartmanna", “Filo-Sofija”, nr 23 (2013/14), pp. 175-184.
 2013, Frederic Tremblay, "Nicolai Hartmann and the Metaphysical Foundation of Phylogenetic Systematics," Biological Theory, vol. 7, n. 1, pp. 56-68.
 2016, Vélez León, Paulo. "An Intellectual Profile of Nicolai Hartmann (1882-1950). Part I". Disputatio. Philosophical Research Bulletin, vol. 5, no. 6, pp. 457-538. (In Spanish)
 2017, Frederic Tremblay, "Vladimir Solovyov, Nicolai Hartmann, and Levels of Reality," Axiomathes, vol. 27, n. 2, pp. 133-146.
 2017, Frederic Tremblay, "Historical Introduction to Nicolai Hartmann's Concept of Possibility," Axiomathes, vol. 27, n. 2, pp. 193-207.
 2018, Alicja Pietras, "The Ontology of Processual Being: Nicolai Hartmann’s Interpretation of the Hegelian Dialectical Process," Constructivist Foundations 14 (1), pp. 62-65, 
 2019, Frederic Tremblay, "Ontological Axiology in Nikolai Lossky, Max Scheler, and Nicolai Hartmann." In Moritz Kalckreuth, Gregor Schmieg, Friedrich Hausen (eds.), Nicolai Hartmanns Neue Ontologie und die Philosophische Anthropologie: Menschliches Leben in Natur und Geist, Berlin/Boston: Walter de Gruyter, pp. 193-232.
 2021, Alicja Pietras, "Nicolai Hartmann and the Transcendental Method, ''Logic and Logical Philosophy 30, n. 3, pp. 461–492.

External links
 
 Nicolai Hartmann Society
 Levels of Reality in the Ontology of Nicolai Hartmann
 Martin Morgenstern, Vom Idealismus zur realistischen Ontologie. Das Frühwerk Nicolai Hartmanns, in: Philosophia: E-Journal of Philosophy and Culture, 5/2013.

1882 births
1950 deaths
Writers from Riga
People from Kreis Riga
Baltic-German people
Kantian philosophers
Ontologists
Systems scientists
20th-century German philosophers
Metaphysicians
Philosophy of biology
Existentialists
Members of the German Academy of Sciences at Berlin